Leptopecten is a genus of bivalves belonging to the family Pectinidae.

The species of this genus are found in Europe and America.

Species

Species:

Leptopecten auroraensis 
Leptopecten bavayi 
Leptopecten biolleyi

References

Pectinidae
Bivalve genera